Robert Quincy Lovett ( 1927 – August 18, 2022) was an American film editor who was nominated at the 57th Academy Awards in the category of Best Film Editing for his work on The Cotton Club. He also participated in the Festival De Cannes for A Bronx Tale, directed by Robert De Niro in 2011. He worked on over 30 films and TV shows from 1963 to 2006.

Lovett died on August 18, 2022, at the age of 95.

Filmography

Editing

Film

Television

References

External links
 
 

1920s births
2022 deaths
Year of birth missing
American film editors